The ninth season of the long-running Australian medical drama All Saints began airing on 28 February 2006 and concluded on 21 November 2006 with a total of 40 episodes.

Cast and characters

Main Cast

Recurring Cast

Guest cast 
Wendy Strehlow, Ally Fowler, Elizabeth Alexander, Naomi Wallace, Trilby Beresford, Mark Owen-Taylor, Murray Bartlett, Zoe Carides, Barry Otto, Alex Cook, Peter Phelps, Lucy Bell, George Spartels, Geoff Morrell, Tony Llewellyn-Jones, Gosia Dobrowolska, Chris Truswell, Zac Drayson, Lynette Curran, Anna Anderson, and Jacinta Stapleton.

Episodes

Please Note: All episode titles are listed accurately as to how they appeared on the episode.

References

General
 Zuk, T. All Saints Series 9 episode guide, Australian Television Information Archive. Retrieved 15 July 2008.
 TV.com editors. All Saints Episode Guide - Season 9, TV.com. Retrieved 15 July 2008.

Specific

All Saints (TV series) seasons
2006 Australian television seasons